The Empire 8 men's basketball tournament is the annual conference basketball championship tournament for the NCAA Division III Empire 8 conference. The tournament has been held annually since 2004. It is a single-elimination tournament and seeding is based on regular season records.

The winner, declared Empire 8 champion, receives the league's automatic bid to the NCAA Men's Division III Basketball Championship.

Prior to 2004, the league championship was awarded to the team with the best regular-season record. Since the tournament's establishment, St. John Fisher was the most successful program, with 6 titles.

Results

Championship records

 Schools highlighted in pink are former members of the Empire 8
 Elmira, Houghton, and Sage have not yet qualified for the Empire 8 tournament finals

References

NCAA Division III men's basketball conference tournaments
Basketball Tournament, Men's
Recurring sporting events established in 2004